This was the first edition of the tournament.

Tereza Mihalíková and Greet Minnen won the title, defeating Monica Niculescu and Vera Zvonareva in the final, 4–6, 6–1, [10–8].

Seeds

Draw

Draw

External Links
Main Draw

Open Angers Arena Loire - Doubles